Rock Me Back to Little Rock is the tenth studio album by American country artist Jan Howard. It was released in June 1970 on Decca Records and was produced by Owen Bradley. The album featured two singles, one of which became a top 20 hit on the Billboard country chart. Additionally, the album would reach peak positions on the Billboard country albums chart.

Background and content
Rock Me Back to Little Rock was recorded in several sessions between 1969 and 1970 at Bradley's Barn, located in Mount Juliet, Tennessee. All sessions were produced by Owen Bradley, Howard's collaborator since signing with the Decca label. The album consisted of 11 tracks, most of which were cover versions of songs by other artists. Of these covers was The Beatles's "Let It Be", Glen Campbell's "Try a Little Kindness" and Simon & Garfunkel's "Bridge Over Troubled Water". The album also included original tracks, such as the title track and Howard's self-penned "Love Is a Sometimes Thing". The latter track would later be released as a single by Howard's friend and musical collaborator, Bill Anderson. Rock Me Back to Little Rock also included two songs that were previously recorded by Connie Smith. The album's second track "You and Your Sweet Love" was a top 10 hit for Smith in 1969 and was co-written by Bill Anderson. The album's tenth track, "I Never Once Stopped Loving You", was composed by both Anderson and Howard. The song also became a top 10 hit for Smith.

Release and reception

Rock Me Back to Little Rock was released in June 1970 on Decca Records via a vinyl record format. The record included six songs on the first side and five songs on the remaining side. The album peaked at number 42 on the Billboard Top Country Albums chart on June 23, 1970. It spent a total of 3 weeks on the chart. The album also featured two singles. The first single, "We Had All the Good Things Going", reached number 20 on the Billboard Hot Country Singles chart in November 1969. It became Howard's sixth and final top 20 hit as a solo artist. The title track was released in 1970, reaching number 26 on the Billboard country songs chart on May 2.

The album was reviewed positively by Billboard in 1970. In their commentary, writers called it a "pop-country product with a few mavericks that she (and produced Owen Bradley) adopted and adapted." Magazine writers praised Howard's covers of "Bridge Over Troubled Water" and "I Never Once Stopped Loving You".

Track listing

Personnel
All credits are adapted from the liner notes of Rock Me Back to Little Rock.

Musical and technical personnel
 Harold Bradley – guitar
 Owen Bradley – producer
 Kenneth Buttrey – drums
 Jimmy Capps – guitar
 Floyd Cramer – piano
 Ray Edenton – guitar
 Buddy Harman – drums
 Jan Howard – lead vocals
 Roy Huskey – bass
 Grady Martin – guitar
 Charlie McCoy – harmonica, vibes
 Hal Rugg – steel guitar
 Jerry Smith – piano
 Pete Wade – guitar

Chart performance

Release history

References

1970 albums
Jan Howard albums
Albums produced by Owen Bradley
Decca Records albums